The Rosshorn (formerly: Roßhorn) is a mountain of the Rieserferner group in Tyrol, Austria.

References 
 Walter Mair: Osttiroler Wanderbuch. Tyrolia, Innsbruck 2005 (7. Auflage),

External links 

Mountains of the Alps
Mountains of Tyrol (state)
Alpine three-thousanders
Geography of East Tyrol